Peter Michael Fenger (born 8 August 1962) is a former Danish handball player who competed in the 1984 Summer Olympics.

He played his club handball with HIK Håndbold. In 1984 he finished fourth with the Denmark men's national handball team in the 1984 Olympic tournament. He played five matches and scored seven goals.

In 2021, he became mayor of Gentofte Municipality.

References

External links
Sports-Reference profile

1962 births
Living people
Danish male handball players
Olympic handball players of Denmark
Handball players at the 1984 Summer Olympics